Hyles gallii, the bedstraw hawk-moth or galium sphinx, is a moth of the family Sphingidae. The species was first described by S. A. von Rottemburg in 1775.

Similar species
Hyles dahlii (Geyer, 1827)
Hyles euphorbiae (Linnaeus, 1758) - spurge hawk-moth
Hyles livornica (Esper, 1779) - lined sphinx
Hyles nicaea (de Prunner, 1798)
Hyles tithymali (Boisduval, 1832)

DNA testing resulted into the following relationships among the Palaearctic widespread species of the genus Hyles:

Distribution
Hyles gallii is present in North America, in Europe to the Arctic Circle, in Central Asia and in Japan.

Description
Hyles gallii have a wingspan reaching 55 to 80 mm. In appearance, this species is very similar to Hyles euphorbiae. However, in H. gallii the red of the hindwings is not so extensive and the olive-colored band on the forewings is not interrupted.

The following information was taken from the public-domain The Illustrated Natural History of British Moths (1869) by Edward Newman.

The Bedstraw Hawk-Moth - Fore wings olive brown, with a broad, irregular, whitish stripe along the middle; hind wings black at the base; then a broad pinkish-white band, quite white near the body, and bright pink about the middle; then a distinct black band, and then a grey margin; thorax and body olive-brown, a white line on each side of the thorax just at the base of the wings; this line runs on each side along the head just above the eye; sides of the body with black and whitish spots.

The caterpillar is smooth, bluish-green above, inclining to pink beneath, sometimes brown and sometimes black, but always having a pale, almost yellow, line down the middle of the back, and a row of ten conspicuous eye-like yellow spots, on each side; the head is green, brown, or black, according to the colour of the caterpillar, but the horn above the tail is invariably red.
…
The chrysalis is brown, and is found in the sand. The caterpillar feeds in August and September, and the Moth appears about Midsummer.

Biology
These moths can be encountered at dusk feeding on flowers, but they are active by night up to the day light. The flight period extends from May to October usually in one generation, but in good years there can be a second generation.

The larva can reach a length of 70 to 80 millimeters and are variable. A variant is olive green with yellow spots. Another version is black with yellow spots and a red head. The colour of the larva darkens before pupation. They feed on fireweed (Chamaenerion angustifolium, Epilobium montanum), on bedstraw (Galium verum and Galium mollugo) and various other plants (Clarkia, Fuchsia, Circaea, Plantago major, etc.). They can be found from July to September.

Habitat
This species prefers sandy or calcareous places, sunny heath, plantations, warm forest edges and wherever else it could find the host plants. These moths can be found in the Alps up to 2700 meters above sea level.

Gallery

References

 A. R. Pittaway: The Hawkmoths of the Western Palaearctic. Harley Books 1993, 
 P.C. Rougeot, P. Viette, Guide des papillons nocturnes d'Europe et d'Afrique du Nord, Delachaux et Niestlé, Lausanne 1978.

External links

Bedstraw Hawk-moth, UKMoths
Hyles gallii, Lepiforum e.V.
Hyles gallii, Portal für Schmetterlinge und Raupen
Description in Richard South's The Moths of the British Isles

Hyles (moth)
Moths described in 1775
Moths of Asia
Moths of Europe
Moths of Iceland
Moths of Japan
Moths of North America
Taxa named by S. A. von Rottemburg
Articles containing video clips